Podium Ambition Pro Cycling powered by Club La Santa was a UCI Women's cycling team based in the United Kingdom, founded in 2013. The team folded at the end of 2016.

Major wins
2014
Stage 2 Tour de Bretagne, Sarah Storey
UCI Track World Cup – Guadalajara (Team Pursuit), Ciara Horne
UCI Track World Cup – Guadalajara (Team Pursuit), Katie Archibald
UCI Track World Cup – London (Team Pursuit), Ciara Horne
UCI Track World Cup – London (Team Pursuit), Katie Archibald
2015
Dudenhofen Omnium, Katie Archibald
Cheshire Classic, Sarah Storey
London Nocturne, Katie Archibald

National, continental and world champions

2014
 World Track (Team Pursuit), Katie Archibald 
 British Track (Individual Pursuit), Katie Archibald 
 British Track (Points race), Sarah Storey 
 European Track (Team Pursuit), Ciara Horne 
 European Track (Team Pursuit), Katie Archibald 
 European Track (Individual Pursuit), Katie Archibald 
2015
 British Track, (Team Pursuit), Sarah Storey 
 British Track, (Team Pursuit), Joanna Rowsell 
 British Track, (Team Pursuit), Horne 
 British Track, (Team Pursuit), Katie Archibald 
 European Track (Team Pursuit), Joanna Rowsell 
 European Track (Team Pursuit), Katie Archibald 
 European Track (Individual Pursuit), Katie Archibald 
2016
 European Track (Omnium), Katie Archibald 
 European Track (Individual Pursuit), Katie Archibald

Team roster 2016

References

External links
 Official website

Cycling teams established in 2013
Cycling teams disestablished in 2016
Cycling teams based in the United Kingdom
2013 establishments in the United Kingdom
2016 disestablishments in the United Kingdom